Padipast (Yaghnobi Падипаст) is a village in Sughd Region, western Tajikistan. It is part of the jamoat Anzob in the Ayni District.

Notes

References
 Сайфиддин Мирзозода: Фарҳанги яғнобӣ-тоҷикӣ. Душанбе (Анҷумани Деваштич) 2008.

Populated places in Sughd Region
Yaghnob